Khasan Mamyrzhanovich Abdukarimov (born 10 March 1990) is a Kazakhstani former footballer who is last known to have played as a striker for ATM.

Career

Before the 2010 season, Abdukarimov signed for Kazakhstani top flight side Okzhetpes, where he made 53 league appearances and scored 7 goals.

In 2012, he signed for Kyran in the Kazakhstani second division.

In 2014, he returned to Okzhetpes.

In 2016, Abdukarimov signed for Malaysian second division club ATM after playing in the Kazakhstani Karabulak village league.

References

External links
 
 

Kazakhstani footballers
Living people
Expatriate footballers in Malaysia
1990 births
FC Kyran players
FC Caspiy players
FC Kyzylzhar players
FC Ordabasy players
Malaysia Premier League players
ATM FA players
Kazakhstan Premier League players
FC Okzhetpes players
Kazakhstan First Division players
Association football forwards